Henry Pierce may refer to:

 Henry L. Pierce (1825–1896), United States Representative from Massachusetts
 Henry B. Pierce (1841–1898), Massachusetts insurance executive and politician
 Henry Niles Pierce (1820–1899), diocesan bishop of Arkansas in the Episcopal Church
 Harry Pierce (1913–1975), Australian rugby league footballer

See also
 Harry Pearce, a fictional character in the British television series Spooks
 Harry Pearce (baseball) (1889–1942), Major League Baseball second baseman
 Henry Pearce (disambiguation)